Shch-310 was a  of the Soviet Navy. She operated in the Baltic Sea during the WW2. During the operations in 1942 the submarine's commander was Georgiy Yegorov.

Service history
The submarine operated in the Baltic Sea and survived the war after having actively took part at the 1942 submarine campaign and the later ones in 1944 and 1945, scoring victories with torpedo attacks.

References 

 

1936 ships
Shchuka-class submarines
Ships built in the Soviet Union
World War II submarines of the Soviet Union